

See also

 Lists of fossiliferous stratigraphic units in Oceania

References
 

Fiji
Paleontology in Fiji
Geology of Fiji
Fiji geography-related lists